Albert Weiss (18 July 1914 – 19 July 1999) was an Australian rules footballer who played for the St Kilda Football Club in the Victorian Football League (VFL).

Notes

External links 

1914 births
1999 deaths
Australian rules footballers from Victoria (Australia)
St Kilda Football Club players